Perdiccas I was king of the ancient Greek kingdom of Macedonia. By allowing thirty years for the span of an average generation from the beginning of Archelaus' reign in 413 BC, British historian Nicholas Hammond estimated that Perdiccas ruled around 653 BC. 

There are two separate historical traditions describing the foundation of the Argead dynasty. The earlier, documented by Herodotus and Thucydides in the fifth century BC, records Perdiccas as the first king of Macedonia. The later tradition first emerged sometime at the beginning of the fourth century BC and claimed that Caranus, rather than Perdiccas, was the founder. Aside from Satyrus, who adds Coenus and Tyrimmas to the list, Marsyas of Pella, Theopompos, and Justin all agree that Caranus was Perdiccas' father. Furthermore, Plutarch claimed in his biography of Alexander the Great that all of his sources agreed that Caranus was the founder. This unhistorical assertion is rejected by modern scholarship as Argead court propaganda, possibly intended to diminish the significance of the name 'Perdiccas' in rival family branches following Amyntas III accession.

Herodotus stated:

References

Notes

Citations

7th-century BC Macedonian monarchs
Argead kings of Macedonia
Mythology of Macedonia (ancient kingdom)
Year of birth unknown